Shorea gratissima is a species of tree in the family Dipterocarpaceae. It is native to Sumatra, Borneo, Peninsular Malaysia, Singapore, Myanmar and Thailand.

References

gratissima
Trees of Sumatra
Trees of Malaya
Trees of Borneo
Trees of Myanmar
Trees of Thailand
Taxonomy articles created by Polbot